The Astral Apartments is an apartment building located at 184 Franklin Street in Greenpoint, Brooklyn, New York City. The Astral was built in 1885–1886 as affordable housing for employees of Charles Pratt's Astral Oil Works. It is a block-long brick and terra cotta building in the Queen Anne style. It features a central projecting section with a deep, three-story-high round arch recess. The roof features inward-looking decorative  grotesques. Original amenities of the building included a settlement house, library, and kindergarten.

Originally, a branch of the Pratt Institute Free Library operated from the ground floor of the Astral.

The building was designed to echo red-brick apartments built for workers by George Peabody in London. It was listed on the National Register of Historic Places in 1982 and designated a New York City landmark in 1983.

In popular culture
The building is the fictional setting for Kate Christensen's 2011 novel The Astral: A Novel.

References

Residential buildings on the National Register of Historic Places in New York City
Residential buildings in Brooklyn
Apartment buildings in New York City
Residential buildings completed in 1886
Queen Anne architecture in New York City
Greenpoint, Brooklyn
National Register of Historic Places in Brooklyn
1886 establishments in New York (state)
New York City Designated Landmarks in Brooklyn